Cryptolithodes sitchensis, variously known as the umbrella crab, Sitka crab or turtle crab, is a species of lithodid crustacean native to coastal regions of the northeastern Pacific Ocean, ranging from Sitka, Alaska to Point Loma, California. Its carapace extends over its legs such that when it pulls in its legs, it resembles a small stone.

Description

Cryptolithodes sitchensis has a half-moon shaped carapace extending over all of its eight walking legs and two chelipeds, giving them their common names of turtle crab, umbrella crab or helmet crab. The carapace can be  at the adult stage and has scalloped edges. This carapace ranges from neutral sandy colors to bright oranges, reds, and purples. The rostrum extends forwards from the carapace, gradually widening before ending abruptly. From above, only the eyes and second antennae are visible. The ventral side is commonly white in color, and the abdomen is protected by multiple hard plates that lack raised margins. The chelipeds are smooth. The fifth pair of walking legs are located at the posterior and are difficult to distinguish.

Range
C. sitchensis can be found from southern Alaska to southern California, where they are common. They live within  of the intertidal zone along the exposed coasts of the Pacific Ocean. This causes a restriction on their distribution as water temperatures change due to global warming.

Identification
The distinguishing characteristic between C. sitchensis and C. typicus is that the rostrum of C. sitchensis is wider distally than proximally, while the opposite is found in C. typicus. Also, C. typicus has raised margins of the abdominal segments, while C. sitchensis does not.

Life history
The larvae of C. sitchensis have six tergites at the megalopal stage. Upon reaching the adult stage, the first and second abdominal segments have fused and the sixth tergite and telson are whole. C. sitchensis males and females have symmetrical abdomens, yet females have a greater number of accessory plates on the left side of the third tergite.

Natural history
C. sitchensis may be hard to spot due to its rough, rock-like exterior, but it is easily caught due to its slow movements. Found most commonly in the intertidal zone, this species feeds on coralline algae. The reason for the diverse colorations of its carapace may be camouflage with its surroundings.

Threats
Natural predators of C. sitchensis include larger marine invertebrates, such as octopuses, seabirds, and marine mammals, such as otters.

A major threat to C. sitchensis in Southern California is deforestation and its effects on the giant kelp forests around the Channel Islands National Park. The forests of Macrocystis pyrifera form a protective canopy, fostering the ideal temperature for various species that are temperature-sensitive, such as C. sitchensis, and the growth of macroalgae and coralline algae needed for their survival.

See also 

 Cryptolithodes expansus

References

External links
 CalPhotos
Video of C. sitchensis

King crabs
Crustaceans of the eastern Pacific Ocean
Crustaceans described in 1853
Taxa named by Johann Friedrich von Brandt